Voice disorders are medical conditions involving abnormal pitch, loudness or quality of the sound produced by the larynx and thereby affecting speech production. These include:

 
 
 Vocal fold nodules
 Vocal fold cysts
 Vocal cord paresis
 Reinke's edema
 Spasmodic dysphonia
 Foreign accent syndrome
 Bogart–Bacall syndrome
 Laryngeal papillomatosis
 Laryngitis

See also 
 Aphasia
 Dysphonia
 Human voice
 Laryngectomy
 Parkinson's disease
 Speech disorder
 Vocology
 Voice changes during puberty

References